Kosmos, in comics, may refer to:

Kosmos (Marvel Comics), a Marvel Comics character
Kid Kosmos, a character created by Jim Starlin
King Kosmos, a DC Comics character

References

See also
Cosmos (disambiguation)
Cosmos (comics)